Joseph Franklin Ellis (born May 3, 1944) is an American former professional basketball player who played eight seasons in the NBA for the Warriors (first in San Francisco then in Oakland). He played college basketball for the San Francisco Dons.

High school career
Ellis attended McClymonds High School in Oakland, from 1960–1962 he was a member of three Tournament of Champions teams. He made the All Tournament Team in both his varsity years and in his senior year was named the All Tournament Most Valuable Player. He was also selected to the All City Teams and in 1962 was named the Northern California Player of the year.

College career
Ellis stayed in state for his collegiate career, joining the University of San Francisco. He played for the Dons from 1963 to 1966, being part of First Team All Conference teams each year. He was named Northern California Player of the Year and also received an All American honorable mention. He was one of four juniors chosen in 1965 to represent the United States in the World University Games. Scoring 1,120 points for the team (third all-time best) he was inducted into the USF Hall of Fame in 1973 and named one of 75 "Legends of the Hilltop" in 2006 for the 150th anniversary of the university. In 2020, USF retired Ellis' number 31.

Professional career
Ellis was selected by the San Francisco Warriors in the second round (13th pick overall) of the 1966 NBA draft. He played eight seasons in the NBA for his hometown club (who relocated to Oakland in 1971), posting 4,825 points at an average of 8.6 per game (and 5.0 rebounds per game). He held double-figure scoring averages in three successive seasons, including averages of 15.8 points per game during the 1969–70 season.

He played for the Belgium Lions of the European Professional Basketball League in 1975.

References

1944 births
Living people
American men's basketball players
Basketball players from Oakland, California
Golden State Warriors players
San Francisco Dons men's basketball players
San Francisco Warriors draft picks
San Francisco Warriors players
Shooting guards
Small forwards